Swim Team is Arms and Sleepers fifth studio album and the third release under Fake Chapter Records. It was released on October 28, 2014. The first single was Hurry Slowly, followed by the album title track Swim Team.

Track listing 
All songs by Arms and Sleepers (M. Lewis & M. Ramic)
 Unbound - 3:28
 Swim Team - 3:44
 Hummingbird - 3:38
 Tiger Tempo - 3:36
 Mingus Mapps - 2:48
 Forever Only - 1:29
 Nobody more than you - 3:33
 Ghost Loop - 3:00
 Hurry Slowly - 3:36
 Better Living Thru Chemistry - 2:36
  Tetro - 3:12

The extended and LP versions were released in 2014

Personnel 
 Written and performed by Arms and Sleepers (Max Lewis and Mirza Ramic)
 Mixed and produced by Arms and Sleepers,

External links 
 Official blog

References 

2014 albums